Chidipi is a village and a panchayat in Kovvur Mandal, West Godavari district of Andhra Pradesh State, India. The nearest railway station is located at Kovvur at a distance of more than 10 km from Chidipi.

Geography
Chidipi is located at 17.03335°N 81.70525°E.[1] It has an average elevation of 25 metres (82 feet). The Godavari river is nearby.

Demographics 

 Census of India, Chidipi had a population of 1584. The total population constitute, 793 males and 791 females with a sex ratio of 997 females per 1000 males. 169 children are in the age group of 0–6 years, with sex ratio of 837. The average literacy rate stands at 81.48%.

References

External links
Chidipi indiamapia

Villages in West Godavari district